Bridesburg is the northernmost neighborhood in the River Wards section of Philadelphia, Pennsylvania, United States. Bridesburg is an historically German and Irish community, with a significant community of Polish immigrants who arrived mostly in the early- to mid-twentieth century. The community is home to two Catholic churches: All Saints Church, designed by Edwin Forrest Durang, built in 1889; and Saint John Cantius Church, built in 1898 in Polish Cathedral style.

Boundaries
The historic boundaries of the former borough of Bridesburg were the original course of Frankford Creek around the south and west, the Delaware River to the southeast, and Port Richmond to the southwest, along a border at Pike Street near Wheatsheaf Lane.
Aramingo Avenue is the border to the western edge of the neighborhood that borders Frankford.
Adjacent neighborhoods are Wissinoming to the northeast, Whitehall to the north, Frankford to the northwest, and Port Richmond to the southwest.

The 19137 ZIP Code, of which Bridesburg forms the major part, extends as far to the southwest as Castor Avenue, and includes some area to the northwest of I-95 and the original course of Frankford Creek. A small portion of Bridesburg (also 19137) is situated directly next to the 19124 ZIP code known as Frankford.

History
Before the arrival of Europeans, the Lenni Lenape Indians inhabited the region. Explorer Henry Hudson in 1609 was the first European to set foot in this region, and based on his findings these Indians were considered to be the first inhabitants of the area.

New Sweden
In 1638, the Swedes bought land east of the Delaware River from the Indians and named it New Sweden. The Swedes lived with the Indians on friendly terms. By 1645 the Swedes had expanded to the Northeast of modern-day Philadelphia, and in 1647 the Dutch arrived. But it was not until the 1680s when the English came with William Penn that the area was actually developed. After 1750, Germans then settled the area, particularly in Bridesburg and Frankford.

Founded in the early 19th century, Bridesburg, a tract of land formerly belonging to Point-no-Point, took its name from Joseph Kirkbride, who for many years owned land there and was proprietor of a ferry over Frankford Creek, and to whom the Legislature gave the right to build a bridge and receive toll for passage over the same by act of March 20, 1811. On April 1, 1833, Philadelphia County bought the Kirkbride bridge and two-and-a-half acres of land annexed for $5,500. Kirkbridesburg was considered too long a name for convenience, and the shorter "Bridesburg" was adopted.  Bridesburg was incorporated as a borough on April 1, 1848.  In 1854, the borough was annexed to the city of Philadelphia in the Act of Consolidation.

Point-No-Point
The region was known in Colonial times as Point-no-Point, due to the deceptive appearance of the blunt cape at the mouth of Frankford Creek. When first seen going northward it appeared to be a point, sharply jutting into the stream, but upon approaching, it lost its character and seemed to be an ordinary portion of the right bank; on further approach it seemed to again jut out into a point.

Principal T. Worcester Worrell used to teach his pupils the ditty:

Point look out, point look in,
Point no Point, and point ag'in.

Many famous personalities in history have passed through the lands of Point-no-Point.  The second President of the United States wrote a letter to his wife Abigail describing his travels in Point-no-Point.

On 25 May 1777 John Adams wrote:

The road to Point-no-point lies along the river Delaware, in fair sight of it and its opposite shore. For near four miles the road is as strait as the streets of Philadelphia. On each side, are beautiful rows of trees, buttonwoods, oaks, walnuts, cherries and willows, especially down towards the banks of the river. The meadows, pastures and grass plats are as green as leeks. There are many fruit trees and fine orchards set with the nicest regularity. But the fields of grain, the rye and wheat exceed all description. These fields are all sown in ridges and the furrow between each couple of ridges is as plainly to be seen as if a swath had been mown along. Yet it is no wider than a ploughshare and it is as strait as an arrow. It looks as if the sower had gone along the furrow with his spectacles to pick up every grain that should accidentally fall into it. The corn is just coming out of the ground. The furrows struck out for the hills to be planted in, are each way as straight, as mathematical right lines ; and the squares between every four hills as exact as they could be done by plumb and line, or scale and compass.

Bridesburg Borough

Bridesburg was incorporated as a borough on April 1, 1848; it included the peninsula between the lower Frankford Creek and the Delaware River, and beyond Richmond district, the boundary lying near the projected line of Pike street, not far from Wheat Sheaf Lane.

It was first called Kirkbridesburg, for Joseph Kirkbride, who operated a ferry to New Jersey, and in 1811 built a toll bridge at Bridge street over Frankford Creek.  About one-hundred forty years ago, the villagers decided the name was too long, and shortened it to Bridesburg. In 1854, the borough was annexed to the city of Philadelphia in the Act of Consolidation.

Bridesburg is home to the second oldest VFW Post in the world, founded in 1899.

Bridesburg is also home to the Joseph A. Ferko String Band. The Ferko String Band is a member of the Philadelphia String Band Association, which is a division of the Philadelphia Mummers Parade.

Population
As of the 2010 Census, Bridesburg had a population of 8,638, of which 90% was white, 5.5% Hispanic, 1.9% was black or African-American, 0.6% was Asian, and the remaining 2% was other or mixed races.

Notable occupants and landmarks
 Betsy Ross Bridge
 Bridesburg Recreation Center
 Most Holy Redeemer Cemetery
 Dow Chemical Company
 AdvanSix Phenol Plant
 Historic Bridesburg School (listed on the National Register of Historic Places; it was demolished in the late 2000s.)
 Aqua String Band
 Ferko String Band

Churches
For its size, Bridesburg is the home of a large number of churches:
 All Saints Roman Catholic Church, Thompson and Buckius Streets, designed by noted ecclesiastical architect Edwin Forrest Durang. (Parish closed. Building stands)
 Bridesburg Emanuel United Church of Christ, Fillmore and Thompson Streets
 Bridesburg Methodist Episcopal Church, 2717 Kirkbride St.
 First Presbyterian Church of Bridesburg, 2770 Pratt St. (closed)
 First Baptist Church of Bridesburg, 2715 Lefevre St. (closed)
 Grace Baptist Church of Bridesburg, 4544 Almond St.
 ReaLife Church, Buckius and Richmond Streets
 St. John Cantius Roman Catholic Church, 4415 Almond St.

Cemeteries
 Holy Redeemer Cemetery
 Emanuel United Church of Christ Cemetery, Fillmore and Almond Streets
 All Saints Church Cemetery

Education
The School District of Philadelphia operates Bridesburg Elementary School, which serves elementary school students. Residents are also zoned to Warren G. Harding Middle School and Frankford High School.

At one time, the Roman Catholic Archdiocese of Philadelphia operated two Catholic schools in Bridesburg: All Saints School (1864-2004) and St. John Cantius School. Pope John Paul II Regional Catholic School (formerly St. John Cantius Elementary School) was in operation from 2004 until 2012. Students choosing Catholic education in a Catholic school attend Blessed Trinity Regional School (formerly St. Timothy's School) in Mayfair since September 2012.

Charter schools include:
 Franklin Towne Charter Elementary School (grades K-8)
 Franklin Towne Charter High School (grades 9–12)
 Maritime Academy Charter School (grades 2–12, with grades 9-12 located in Fishtown)

Government and infrastructure
The United States Post Office operates the Bridesburg Post Office at 2734 Orthodox Street.

Public Transportation 
Septa bus routes 25, 73, J, and 84 all run in/near the neighborhood. Bridesburg station of the Trenton Line of SEPTA Regional Rail is located in the neighborhood.

See also

References

Further reading
  Siegle, Frederick and Teresa Pyott, Bridesburg (Arcadia Publishing, 2004) 
 Johnson, Amandus, The Swedish Settlements on the Delaware Volume I: Their History and Relation to the Indians, Dutch and English, 1638-1664 (1911)

External links 

 Point No Point
 Bridesburg School

 
1854 disestablishments in Pennsylvania
Irish-American neighborhoods
Municipalities in Philadelphia County prior to the Act of Consolidation, 1854
Neighborhoods in Philadelphia
Polish-American culture in Pennsylvania
Populated places established in 1848
1848 establishments in Pennsylvania